Herman Karl Carlsson (11 September 1906 – 18 February 1990) was a Swedish ice hockey player. He competed in the men's tournament at the 1936 Winter Olympics.

References

External links
 

1906 births
1990 deaths
Ice hockey players at the 1936 Winter Olympics
Olympic ice hockey players of Sweden
Ice hockey people from Stockholm